The Oak Hill Cemetery is a historic cemetery in Bartow, Florida. It is located on West Parker Street. On February 12, 2003, it was added to the U.S. National Register of Historic Places. People interred there include Confederate General Evander M. Law.

References

External links
 Polk County listings at National Register of Historic Places
 Historic Bartow – History & Heritage
 
 

National Register of Historic Places in Polk County, Florida
Bartow, Florida
Protected areas of Polk County, Florida